In software engineering, the delegation pattern is an object-oriented design pattern that allows object composition to achieve the same code reuse as inheritance.

In delegation, an object handles a request by delegating to a second object (the delegate).  The delegate is a helper object, but with the original context. With language-level support for delegation, this is done implicitly by having self in the delegate refer to the original (sending) object, not the delegate (receiving object). In the delegate pattern, this is instead accomplished by explicitly passing the original object to the delegate, as an argument to a method. Note that "delegation" is often used loosely to refer to the distinct concept of forwarding, where the sending object simply uses the corresponding member on the receiving object, evaluated in the context of the receiving object, not the original object.

Note that this article uses "sending object/receiving object" for the two objects, rather than "receiving object/delegate", emphasizing which objects send and receive the delegation call, not the original call.

Definition 
In the Introduction to Gamma et al. 1994, Grady Booch defined delegation as:

Example 
In the example below (using the Kotlin programming language), the class Window delegates the area() call to its internal Rectangle object (its delegate).

class Rectangle(val width: Int, val height: Int) {
    fun area() = width * height
}

class Window(val bounds: Rectangle) {
    // Delegation
    fun area() = bounds.area()
}

Language support 
Some languages have special support for delegation built in. For example, in the Kotlin programming language, we could write:

interface ClosedShape {
    fun area(): Int
}

class Rectangle(val width: Int, val height: Int) : ClosedShape {
    override fun area() = width * height
}

class Window(private val bounds: ClosedShape) : ClosedShape by bounds

See also 
 Delegation (object-oriented programming)
 Forwarding (object-oriented programming)
 Aspect-oriented programming
 Delegation (computing)
 Design pattern
 Facade pattern
 Schizophrenia (object-oriented programming)

References

External links
 What Is Delegation, WikiWikiWeb
 Delegation on Rosetta Code

Articles with example C++ code
Articles with example Java code
Software design patterns